Ronald James Shudra (born November 28, 1967) is a Canadian-British retired professional ice hockey player. Most of his career, which lasted from 1987 to 2009, was mostly spent in the United Kingdom, though he also played 10 games in the National Hockey League with the Edmonton Oilers during the 1987–88 season. In 2010, he was inducted to the British Ice Hockey Hall of Fame.

Playing career
He was drafted 63rd overall by the Edmonton Oilers in the 1986 NHL Entry Draft and played ten games for them in 1987–88 season. He spent the rest of his career in the United Kingdom, retiring in 2009.

Coaching career
Shudra was the player / coach for the Sheffield Scimitars in the English Premier Ice Hockey League and named as junior coach (U-12) of the team on 3 May 2009.

Personal life
Shudra has 3 children: daughter Dana and 2 sons, Cole and Tate.

Career statistics

Regular season and playoffs

Awards
 WHL West Second All-Star Team – 1986 & 1987
Inducted to the British Ice Hockey Hall of Fame in 2010.

References

External links
 

1967 births
Living people
British Ice Hockey Hall of Fame inductees
British ice hockey players
Canadian expatriate ice hockey players in England
Canadian ice hockey right wingers
Cape Breton Oilers players
Coventry Blaze players
Denver Rangers players
Edmonton Oilers draft picks
Edmonton Oilers players
Fort Wayne Komets players
Hull Thunder players
Kamloops Blazers players
Nova Scotia Oilers players
Sheffield Steelers players
Ice hockey people from Winnipeg